Zighoud Youcef is a town and commune in Constantine Province, Algeria. According to the 2008 census it has a population of 28,764. The town was formerly known as Smendou, and was renamed to its current name in honor of Youcef Zighoud, a guerrilla leader who was killed fighting for Algerian independence against the French.

Notable people
 Djamel Mesbah – Algerian international footballer who played at the 2010 FIFA World Cup

References

External links

Communes of Constantine Province